The Mount Hood Masonic Temple in Portland, Oregon is a Masonic building from 1923. It was listed on the National Register of Historic Places in 2008. Vacant since 1981, it was purchased by the McMenamins brewpub chain in 2007.  Plans for renovation of the building were still being formulated in 2012.

References

External links

1923 establishments in Oregon
Colonial Revival architecture in Oregon
Masonic buildings completed in 1923
Former Masonic buildings in Oregon
National Register of Historic Places in Portland, Oregon
Humboldt, Portland, Oregon
North Portland, Oregon